Charlotte was a New Brunswick electoral district. It existed from the first legislature in 1785 until it was abolished in 1973 when New Brunswick went from bloc voting to single-member ridings. The riding of St. Stephen-Milltown was briefly separated from this riding between 1924 and 1926.

Members of the Legislative Assembly

Election results

Notes

Former provincial electoral districts of New Brunswick
1974 disestablishments in New Brunswick